Litozamia acares is a species of sea snail, a marine gastropod mollusk, in the family Muricidae, the murex snails or rock snails.

Description
The length of the shell attains 4 mm.

Distribution
This marine species occurs off New Caledonia.

References

acares
Gastropods described in 2013